Acacia atopa is a tree belonging to the genus Acacia and the subgenus Juliflorae. It is native to an area of the Gascoyne and Mid West regions of Western Australia.

See also
List of Acacia species

References

atopa
Acacias of Western Australia
Plants described in 2001
Taxa named by Leslie Pedley